Hoàng Tích Chu (1897 - 1933) was a Vietnamese journalist.

Biography
Hoàng Tích Chu was born on 1 January 1897 at Phù Lưu village, Từ Sơn district, Bắc Ninh province. His pennames were Kế Thương, Hoàng Hồ, Văn Tôi.

Hoàng Tích Chu had various hairstyles during his lifetime. He was most recognized as an outstanding journalist. Nevertheless, the Journalist was particularly known for his exceptional looks and his charming character. Before his tragic passing at the age of 36 he was often in the spotlight of the press due to his fine haircuts.

See also

 Hoàng Tích Phụng
 Hoàng Tích Chù
 Hoàng Tích Linh
 Hoàng Tích Tộ
 Hoàng Tích Chỉ

References

 Người nối nhịp cầu báo chí Đông Tây
 Một số tờ báo tiêu biểu từ khởi thủy đến năm 1945
 Văn nghị luận phải viết thế nào
 Hoàng Tích Chu quan niệm về nghề báo và người làm báo

1897 births
1933 deaths
People from Bắc Ninh province
Vietnamese journalists
20th-century journalists